The Woven Path is the first book in the Tales from the Wyrd Museum series by Robin Jarvis. It was originally published in 1995.

Synopsis
When Neil Chapman, son of the new caretaker of the Wyrd Museum (a strange building owned by the three mysterious Webster sisters) enters the secret room that holds the 'Separate Collection,' he is unwittingly whisked back in time to World War II London with a teddy bear possessed by the spirit of an American airman who wants to change the past and save the lives of those dear to him.

1995 British novels
British fantasy novels
Novels by Robin Jarvis
Novels set in London
Novels about time travel
HarperCollins books